Meladeniya Grama Niladhari Division is a Grama Niladhari Division of the Bingiriya Divisional Secretariat of Kurunegala District of North Western Province, Sri Lanka. It has Grama Niladhari Division Code 1437.

Meladeniya is a surrounded by the Heenpannawa, Padiwela and Udawela Grama Niladhari Divisions.

Demographics

Ethnicity 
The Meladeniya Grama Niladhari Division has a Sinhalese majority (99.1%). In comparison, the Bingiriya Divisional Secretariat (which contains the Meladeniya Grama Niladhari Division) has a Sinhalese majority (96.3%)

Religion 
The Meladeniya Grama Niladhari Division has a Buddhist majority (97.3%). In comparison, the Bingiriya Divisional Secretariat (which contains the Meladeniya Grama Niladhari Division) has a Buddhist majority (85.4%) and a significant Roman Catholic population (10.3%)

References 

Grama Niladhari Divisions of Bingiriya Divisional Secretariat